Kieseritzy is the surname of several people:

 Gustav Kieseritzky (1893–1943), highly decorated Vizeadmiral in the German Kriegsmarine during World War II
 Lionel Kieseritzky (1806–1853), Baltic-German chess master and writer
 R.K. Kieseritzky (c. 1870 – after 1923), Russian chess master

Also

 Boden-Kieseritzky Gambit, chess opening named for Samuel Standridge Boden and Lionel Kieseritzky
 Kieseritzky Gambit, chess opening named for Lionel Kieseritzky